Turritella bicingulata is a species of sea snail, a marine gastropod mollusk in the family Turritellidae.

Description

Distribution
This species occurs in the Atlantic Ocean off Cape Verde, Gabon and Angola.

References

External links
  Lamarck [J.-B. M.] de. (1822). Histoire naturelle des animaux sans vertèbres. Tome septième. Paris: published by the Author, 711 pp

Turritellidae
Gastropods of Africa
Gastropods described in 1822